Men's Downhill World Cup 1986/1987

Final point standings

Pirmin Zurbriggen won the cup with maximum points. Swiss athletes won 8 races out of 10.

References
 fis-ski.com

External links
 

World Cup
FIS Alpine Ski World Cup men's downhill discipline titles